Nigel Harte is a Gaelic footballer who plays for Tyrrellspass and at senior level for the Westmeath county team. He was a U20 player in the 2018 All-Ireland Under 20 Football Championship.

Harte won the 2022 Tailteann Cup. He was put in to the team for playing in the final and was going to be the only change from the semi-final instead of Sam Duncan and then Duncan played. He played his part earlier against Laois when he rounded the keeper and got fouled and got a penalty.

Honours
Westmeath
 Tailteann Cup (1): 2022

References

Year of birth missing (living people)
Living people
Tyrrellspass Gaelic footballers
Westmeath inter-county Gaelic footballers